Lal Bihari Himirika (Odia: ଲାଲ ବିହାରୀ ହିମିରିକା, born 17 February 1948) is an Indian politician from Biju Janata Dal (BJD). He is currently MLA of Rayagada constituency of Odisha. He represented the Odisha Assembly from Rayagada Vidhan Sabha constituency in 2009 and 2014 assembly elections.

Personal Background 
Sri Himirika hails from Penta village of Rayagada district in the state of Odisha.

Political career
Started his career as a union worker in the JK paper mills, Jaykaypur. He served as the SC & ST development minister in the 15th assembly of Odisha. Sri Ramesh Chandra Majhi succeeded him in May 2017. He also served as a member of the KBK Committee. Himirika was later appointed the president of Rayagada district BJD.

Committee membership 
 Member -House Committee on environment- 2000-2001
 Member -Committee on welfare of SC & ST- 2000-2001
 Member -House Committee on Cooperatives- 2001-2002
 Member -House Committee on environment- 2001-2002
 Member -Committee on welfare of SC & ST- 2001-2002
 Member -House Committee on Cooperatives- 2001-2002
 Member -House Committee on environment- 2002-2003
 Member -Committee on welfare of SC & ST- 2002-2003
 Member -House Committee on Cooperatives- 2003-2004
 Member -Committee on welfare of SC & ST- 2003-2004

References

1948 births
Living people
Odisha Legislative Assembly
Biju Janata Dal politicians